Edward Mayo is the name of:

 E. L. Mayo (1904-1979), American poet
 Eddie Mayo (1910-2006), American Major League Baseball player

See also
 Ed Mayo, Secretary General of Co-operatives UK